Cincelichthys pearsei, the Pantano cichlid, is a species of fish in the family Cichlidae from the Usumacinta River basin in southern Mexico and northern Guatemala.

References 

https://www.fishbase.se/summary/26774
https://www.uniprot.org/taxonomy/383918
https://www.cambridge.org/core/journals/journal-of-helminthology/article/closer-look-at-the-morphological-and-molecular-diversity-of-neoechinorhynchus-acanthocephala-in-middle-american-cichlids-osteichthyes-cichlidae-with-the-description-of-a-new-species-from-costa-rica/99A85D4ABF729C307AB009A71FE29672

Heroini